Sivananda Radha Saraswati (March 20, 1911 – November 30, 1995), born Sylvia Demitz, was a German yogini who emigrated to Canada and founded Yasodhara Ashram in British Columbia.  She established a Western-based lineage in the Sivananda tradition and published books on several branches of Yoga, including Kundalini Yoga for the West and Mantras; Words of Power.  She was a member of the California Institute of Transpersonal Psychology and developed transpersonal psychology workshops to help students prepare for intense spiritual practice.  Teachers trained at Yasodhara Ashram can now be found across North America and in Europe, the Caribbean, Japan, Australia and New Zealand.

Biography

Early life 

Sivananda Radha (born as Sylvia Demitz, and during her marriage known as Ursula Sylvia Hellman) was born in Germany on March 20, 1911. She became a creative writer, photographer and a solo concert dancer early in life. She lived through both wars in Berlin but learned from her experiences that life can be cruel and came to question the existence of God.

Her first marriage ended when her husband, Wolfgang, was executed at Buchenwald for helping Jewish friends leave Germany. She married again in 1947. Albert Hellman was a composer and violinist, but he died after one year of marriage.  She also lost both parents in the war. "Thoroughly sick at heart with the brutality and stupidity of the world", she survived and, in 1951, emigrated to Canada settling in Montreal, finding work in the advertising department of a chemical firm, and becoming a Canadian citizen.

Spiritual life 

A search for the meaning of life through yoga and meditation took her to India to Sivananda Saraswati of Rishikesh.

Sivananda challenged her to think deeply about the purpose of life. ‘He used every moment to teach you something’.  His commitment to selfless service made a deep impression on her and Karma Yoga became a key practice in her own life and subsequently in the running of her Ashram. She was initiated into sanyas and given the name Sivananda Radha Saraswati on 2 February 1956. In her publications she described extraordinary events that followed her initiation: she writes that she met the legendary yogi Babaji, the deathless avatar described by Paramahansa Yogananda in Autobiography of a Yogi, the first time in a visionary experience in Montreal.

Upon return to Canada, interpreting her initiation into sanyas as a commitment to abstain "from all actions which arise from ambition and selfish desire … giving up mental and emotional attachment to life in this world" she began a new life in Montreal with no money or employment, learning to live on the charity of others.  However, she quickly attracted attention in her orange sari, with her unconventional life-style, and through her willingness to speak publicly about her experiences in India.  Within a few months, she was offering yoga classes, had been interviewed on CBC radio, travelled to Ottawa to speak, and been sponsored by the Canadian-India Association to fly to Vancouver to lecture on Indian philosophy.

Within a year, in 1957, in Burnaby, British Columbia, she founded Sivananda Ashram, in an old ten-roomed house, where she offered classes, meditation and satsangs. She also opened the Yoga Vedanta Bookstore on Robson Street in downtown Vancouver. In 1963, the Ashram moved to its present location and was renamed Yasodhara Ashram.  Sivananda Radha also gave sanyas initiations to the young men who accompanied her and worked with her to establish the Ashram, beginning a new, Western based lineage, honouring the traditions of the Saraswati Order.

For many years she focussed on establishing the Ashram, making forest cabins habitable, constructing new buildings, corresponding with students, establishing yoga teaching programs and publishing a newsletter to raise funds and draw people to the Ashram.  ‘In the early years of the Ashram … traveling … was necessary to give workshops and lectures to “put the ashram on the map” as she called it.’  She visited England, the Netherlands and Germany, and frequently toured throughout North America.  She lectured in many North American universities and, in 1976, co-led a conference with Herbert Guenther at Yasodhara Ashram on the role of gurus in the West. At a time when understanding of the relationships between Yoga, science and psychology were in their infancy, Radha took an active interest.  In Minneapolis, she participated in biofeedback experiments with Dr. Jose Feola, exploring the nature of the effects of spiritual practices, and she contributed to Scientific Conferences, such as the Council Grove Conference in Kansas.  Discovering the need for students to deal with their psychological and emotional obstacles before embarking on intense spiritual practice, she also embraced transpersonal psychology, becoming a faculty member and graduate teacher at California Institute of Transpersonal Psychology, and developing a course on ‘Psychology towards Higher Consciousness’ that she taught at Antioch College, Seattle.

In the 1980s and early 1990s her organizational legacy took shape. Sivananda Radha opened yoga centres  in North America, Mexico and England where classes and satsangs were offered by teachers trained at Yasodhara Ashram. A Temple, dedicated to the Light in All Religions, was opened at her Ashram in 1992.  She died peacefully at her teaching centre in Spokane, in Washington State, in the early morning, 30 November 1995.

Legacy 

Sivananda Radha was among the prominent disciples of Sivananda who developed new organizations that are not affiliated to the original ashrams run by the Divine Life Society.  Radha established an independent and primarily female, Western lineage as part of the Saraswati Order.  This is now led by Radhananda Saraswati, spiritual director of Yasodhara Ashram.  She initiates aspirants and has oversight of the work of non-profit organizations supporting teachers in different countries.  Radhananda has described her spiritual training at the feet of Sivananda Radha in her memoir, Carried by a Promise: A Life Transformed by Yoga.

Sivananda Radha formed the Timeless Books imprint in 1978 and wrote many books of yoga, including Kundalini Yoga for the West, Hatha Yoga: The Hidden Language, The Divine Light Invocation and Mantras: Words of Power.  Her memoirs are published in Radha: Diary of a Woman's Search and her experiences with gurus and other spiritual teachers are reported in In the Company of the Wise.  Her books have been translated into 5 languages.

Works

 From the Mating Dance to the Cosmic Dance, (Spokane, WA, 1992)
 "Guru-Disciple Relationship", Lifetime Magazine (March 1992)
 Hatha Yoga the Hidden Language (Spokane, WA, 1987, 1995, 2006)
 "Heart" in Kundalini Rising, by Gurmukh Kaur Khalsa, Ken Wilber, Swami Radha, Gopi Krishna (2009)
 In the Company of the Wise (Spokane, WA, 1991, 2011)
 Kundalini Yoga for the West (Spokane, WA, 1978, 2011)
 Light and Vibration: Mysticism and the Culmination of Yoga  (Spokane, WA, 2007)
 Mantras: Words of Power (Spokane, WA, 1980, 1994, 2005)
 "On Meditation", in ed., N. Armstrong, Harvest of Light (London, 1976)
 On Sanyas: the Yoga of Renunciation (Spokane, WA, 2010)
 Radha: Diary of a Woman"s Search (Spokane, WA, 1981, 2002, 2011)
 Realities of the Dreaming Mind: The Practice of Dream Yoga (Spokane, WA, 1994, 1996, 2004)
 Seeds of Light (Spokane, WA, 1985, 1991)
 "The Dance of Life", Yoga Centre of Victoria (September, 1983)
 The Devi of Speech: the goddess in kundalini yoga (Spokane, WA, 2005)
 The Divine Light Invocation (Spokane, WA, 2006)
 "The Last Message", Yoga Centre of Victoria (December 1995 - January 1996)
 "The Search for Union", in ed., S. Miners, A Spiritual Approach to Male/Female Relations (IL, 1984)
 The Yoga of Healing (Spokane, WA, 2006)
 Time to be Holy: Collected Satsang Talks (Spokane, WA, 1996, 2010)
 When you first called me Radha (Spokane, WA, 2005)
 "Women and Spirituality: First Steps to the Spiritual Life", in ed., T. King, The Spiral Path: Explorations in Women"s Spirituality (St Paul, MN, 1992)
 "Women"s Place in Today"s World", in ed., S. Grof, Ancient Wisdom and Modern Science (New York, 1984)

References

Further reading

 Curtis, L., "Column", The Albertan (June 8, 1968)
 Chusid, S., "Meditation Leads Woman To Gamble On Her Future", Winnipeg Press (1968)
 Durgananda, S., Durga's Embrace: A Disciple’s Diary (Spokane, Washington, 2006)
 Fields, R., "In Memoriam, Swami Sivananda Radha", Yoga Journal (April 1996)
 Feuerstein, G., The Path of Yoga: an Essential Guide to its Principles and Practices (2011)
 Feuerstein, G., The Shambhala Encyclopedia of Yoga and Tantra (Boston and London, 1997, 2011)
 Gregory, L., "Om free", Canadian Geographic, Travel Special Issue, (Winter 2007-8)
 Kennet, J., S. Radha, R. Frage, "How to be a Transpersonal Teacher without Becoming a Guru". Journal of Transpersonal Psychology, Vol. 7:1 (1975) 
 Krishnananda, S., Gurudev Sivananda: Pictorial Volume (Tehri-Garhwal, Uttar Pradesh, India, 1987)
 May, A., "In Quest of a Slim Waist", Psychic (Jan/Feb 1977)
 May, A., "Profile: Swami Sivananda Radha, the Feminine Mystic", Psychic (Jan/Feb 1977)
 McKay, J., Glimpses of a Mystical Affair: Spiritual Experience of Swami Sivananda Radha (Spokane, Washington, 1997)
 McKay, J., "Swami Sivananda Radha: On Spiritual Leadership". The Quest Magazine (Summer 1993)
 Paul, R., "Portrait of Swami Radha", Yoga Journal (October 1981)
 Radhananda, S., Carried by a Promise: A Life Transformed by Yoga (Spokane, Washington, 2011)
 Rawlinson, A., The Book of Enlightened Masters: Western Teachers in Eastern Traditions (Chicago and La Salle, Illinois, 1997)
 Robinson, M., "Seekers after Truth: Knowledge Goal of Kootenay Bay Retreat", Vancouver Sun (Dec 31, 1965)
 Sivananda, S., "Farewell to Swami Sivananda Radha", Yoga Centre of Victoria (December 1995-January 1996)
 White, J. "An Interview with Swami Sivananda Radha: Portrait of a Yogini: A Woman's Experience of the Spiritual Life", Science of Mind (September 1985)
 Yogananda, P. Autobiography of a Yogi (New York, 1946)

External links 

 Ascent magazine
 The Divine Life Society, our Heritage, Swami Sivananda Radha 
 Friends of Radha Foundation (Canada) 
 Radha House Association (England and Wales) 
 Swami Radha's blog at Timeless Books
 Yasodhara Ashram  
 Yoga Journal, Luminaries, 'Swami Radha', Jeanne Ricci

1911 births
1995 deaths
German yogis
German emigrants to Canada
Yoga teachers